Pterolophia medioplagiata is a species of beetle in the family Cerambycidae. It was described by Stephan von Breuning in 1938. It has a wide distribution in Africa.

References

medioplagiata
Beetles described in 1938